Sister Bernadette's Barking Dog: The Quirky History and Lost Art of Diagramming Sentences is a 2006 book by author Kitty Burns Florey about the history and art of sentence diagramming. Florey learned to diagram sentences as a Catholic school student at St. John the Baptist Academy in Syracuse, New York. Diagramming sentences is useful, Florey says, because it teaches us to "focus on the structures and patterns of language, and this can help us appreciate it as more than just a vehicle for expressing minimal ideas". Florey said in a 2012 essay "Taming Sentences":
When we unscrew a sentence, figure out what makes it tick and reassemble it, we interact with our old familiar language differently, more deeply, responding to the way its individual components fit together. Once we understand how sentences work (what’s going on? what action is taking place? who is doing it and to whom is it being done?), it’s harder to write an incorrect one.

Sentence diagramming was introduced by Brainerd Kellogg and Alonzo Reid, professors at the Brooklyn Polytechnic Institute, in their book History of English published in 1877.

Reception
Writing for The Wall Street Journal, Charles Harrington Elster calls the book a "pleasantly discursive and affectionate tribute to an antiquated art" in which Florey explains the concept and history of sentence diagramming with sentences by Lewis Carroll, Woody Allen, Henry James, Marcel Proust, Mark Twain, and William Faulkner. Publishers Weekly says Sister Bernadette's Barking Dog is "part memoir, part literary gossip, but mostly a guide to the lost art of sentence diagramming" which "hilariously ... answers such questions as, Why did Gertrude Stein hate commas? Was Mark Twain or James Fenimore Cooper the better grammarian? And why ... is George W. Bush such a lousy speaker?"

References

External links 
 Author's page

2006 non-fiction books
Books about writing
English grammar books
English-language books